Total Divas is an American reality television series that premiered on July 28, 2013, on E!. The series gave viewers an inside look at the lives of WWE Divas from their work within WWE to their personal lives.

Production
On April 4, 2018, speculations arose about the upcoming eighth season of Total Divas, as reports stated that E! cameras had been filming a handful of WWE female wrestlers in New Orleans during the WrestleMania weekend. Paige, who was a part of the main cast from seasons 3 to 6, was also seen being followed by E! cameras, speculating her possible return to the series. On April 13, it was confirmed that Paige would be returning to the series for the eighth season. With these reports, the status of the remaining cast members are left unknown. On May 15, 2018, it was announced that Carmella would not be returning for the show's eighth season. On May 25, Paige and Nia Jax posted a video together using a hash tag indicating they were filming for the show, confirming Nia Jax as a cast member for the upcoming season. On May 31, it was reported that Brie and Nikki Bella were seen filming an episode of the upcoming season with cast members Lana, Natalya, and Paige, confirming their involvement with the eighth season.

On May 7, 2018, E! and WWE announced that Total Divas had been renewed for seasons 8 and 9. Season 8 is expected to air in fall 2018.

On July 26, 2018, it was announced that season 8 would premiere on September 19, 2018, and the cast for the season was confirmed to be Brie and Nikki Bella, Naomi, Natalya, Lana, Nia Jax, and Paige.

Cast

Main cast
 Brie Bella (Brianna Danielson)
 Naomi (Trinity Fatu)
 Natalya (Natalie Neidhart-Wilson)
 Nikki Bella (Stephanie Nicole Garcia-Colace)
 Paige (Saraya-Jade Bevis)
 Lana (Catherine Perry)
 Nia Jax (Savelina Fanene)

Recurring cast
 Daniel Bryan (Brie's husband)
 Jimmy Uso (Naomi's husband)
 Tyson Kidd (Natalya's husband)
 Rusev (Lana's husband)
 Jim Neidhart (Nattie's father)
 Ellie Neidhart (Nattie's mother)

Guest stars 
 Alexa Bliss (Alexis Kaufman)
 Alicia Fox (Victoria Crawford)
 Carmella (Leah Van Dale)
 JoJo (Joseann Offerman)
 Mandy Rose (Amanda Rose Saccomanno)
 Renee Young (Renee Paquette)
 Ember Moon (Adrienne Reese)
 Mark Carrano (WWE Senior Director of Talent Relations)
 The Miz (Michael Mizanin)
 Ronda Rousey (WWE wrestler)
 Sonya Deville (Daria Berenato)
 Tamina (Sarona Snuka-Polamalu)
 Kathy Colace (Brie & Nikki's mother)
 J.J. Garcia (Brie & Nikki's brother)

Episodes

Ratings

References

Total Divas